The Battle of Kerzhenets (tr.: Secha pri Kerzhentse) is a 1971 Soviet animated film directed by Ivan Ivanov-Vano and Yuri Norstein. The film is set to music by Rimsky-Korsakov and uses Russian frescoes and paintings from the 14th–16th centuries. These are animated using 2-dimensional stop motion animation.

Plot
The story is based on the legend of the Invisible City of Kitezh (made into a 4-act opera by Rimsky-Korsakov in 1907), which disappears under the waters of a lake to escape an attack by the Mongols. (Russia was under the Mongol-Tartar yoke for a period of three centuries in the Middle Ages.)

The film itself follows the legend only loosely, however, and its highpoint is a battle between the Russian soldiers and the Mongol hordes, symbolizing a clash of cultures (the Virgin Mary appears early in the film, in effect watching over the Russian side of the battle).

Awards
1971—Karlovy Vary International Film Festival: Prize for Best Animated Film
1972—Zagreb World Festival of Animated Films: Grand Prize
1972—Tbilisi: Prize for Best Animated Film
1972—Bombay Film Festival: "Diplom"

Creators

See also
History of Russian animation
List of stop-motion films

External links

 The Battle of Kerzhenets at the Animator.ru (English and Russian)

1971 films
Soviet animated short films
1970s stop-motion animated films
Films directed by Ivan Ivanov-Vano
Films directed by Yuri Norstein
Films based on Russian folklore
Soyuzmultfilm
1970s animated short films
1971 short films